Alan Howard Shaw is the chief executive officer and president of Norfolk Southern, a Class I railroad operating freight trains in the United States. He has held the CEO position since May 1, 2022.

Early life
Shaw attended Virginia Tech and received a Bachelor of Science in 1989 and a Master of Business Administration there in 1992. At Harvard Business School he completed the General Management Program in 2012.

Career
Prior to becoming president of Norfolk Southern in 2021 and CEO in 2022, Shaw was vice president of marketing at the company for six years. He had previously been vice president of intermodal operations at the company. His first vice president position at Norfolk Southern was vice president of chemicals, beginning in 2009. He also sits on the board of Virginia Wesleyan University. He sits on the boards of other educational institutions as well.

He has drawn attention in the wake of February 3, 2023, East Palestine railroad derailment of a 150 car train and chemical leakage in East Palestine, Ohio. He visited the community in the week following the accident, and he followed this with a public letter to the community, which began, "We will not walk away, East Palestine." On a second visit he met with the city's Mayor Trent Conaway, Congressman Bill Johnson, Fire Chief Keith Drabick, and first responders. On February 22, 2023, he appeared at a town hall on CNN hosted by Jake Tapper. In the town hall, he apologized to East Palestine residents, "I'm terribly sorry for what has happened to your community." He added, "I want you to know that Norfolk Southern is here, and we're going to stay here. And we're going to make this right."

References

American chief operating officers
American chief executives
Norfolk Southern Railway
Norfolk Southern Railway people
20th-century American railroad executives
21st-century American railroad executives
Virginia Tech alumni
Year of birth missing (living people)
Living people